= Symplecis =

Scientific classification
- Domain: Eukaryota
- Kingdom: Animalia
- Phylum: Arthropoda
- Class: Insecta
- Order: Hymenoptera
- Family: Ichneumonidae
- Genus: Symplecis; Gravenhorst, 1829

Genus of insects

Symplecis is a genus of parasitoid wasps belonging to the family Ichneumonidae.

The genus has almost cosmopolitan distribution.

Species:

- Symplecis alpicola Forster, 1871
- Symplecis beaumontor Aubert, 1968
